Zvi Yedidia Sukkot (born 3 October 1990) is an Israeli activist and politician currently serving as a Member of the Knesset for the Religious Zionist Party. Sukkot previously served as the Executive Director of the far-right Otzma Yehudit party.

Background 
Zvi Sukkot lives in Yitzhar, and is married, with three children. He was a former representative of the group known as "The Revolt". He is known for his participation in right-wing activism in Israel.

Activities 
On 18 January 2010, he was arrested along with 9 other people as part of an investigation of a mosque arson. In 2012, he was expelled from the West Bank under suspicion that he was part of a group of 12 that had planned and carried out violent attacks against Palestinians and their property. The organization  provided him with legal representation. On 25 December 2015, he organized a demonstration against the Shin Bet in Tel Aviv in which he re-enacted the alleged torture of Jewish prisoners who were suspected to have been involved with the Duma Arson attack. On 6 July 2017, he was arrested on suspicion of engaging in "price tagging". On 13 December 2017, he filmed Arab stone-throwers in Yitzhar, and accused "Rabbis for Human Rights" of splicing and editing footage. On 25 December 2017, he was arrested for protesting the demolition of a home in the outpost of Yishuv Hada'at. On 9 January 2018, he, along with other members from Otzma Yehudit, removed a "terror-inciting" billboard. On 14 January 2018, he, along with other members of the leadership of Otzma Yehudit, organized a crowd-funding campaign to purchase drone equipment to film Arab stone-throwers.

Ahead of the 2022 Israeli legislative election, Sukkot was given the sixteenth spot on a joint list between Otzma Yehudit, the Religious Zionist Party and Noam, representing the Religious Zionist Party. He subsequently entered the Knesset on 8 February 2023 as a replacement for Bezalel Smotrich, who resigned under the Norwegian Law.

References

External links 

 

1990 births
Living people
Otzma Yehudit politicians
Israeli settlers
Israeli Orthodox Jews
Israeli Kahanists
Members of the 25th Knesset (2022–)